The Algodor is a 102 km long river in Central Spain. It is a left hand tributary to the Tagus.

Course
Its source is at the Laguna del Navajo in the Montes de Toledo, within the Retuerta del Bullaque municipal limits, Castile-La Mancha. It flows roughly northwards across the Province of Toledo into the Tagus at Aceca, a place near Algodor, the village within the Aranjuez municipality limits that gives the river its name.

The Algodor River has two dams, which form the 133 hm³ Embalse de Finisterre reservoir built in 1977, located between Tembleque, Mora, Villanueva de Bogas and Turleque, and the smaller 8 hm³ Embalse del Castro reservoir built in 1974 near Villamuelas.

All the Algodor's tributaries are small rivulets except for the Bracea River on its left margin.

See also 
 List of rivers of Spain

References

External links 
 Confederación Hidrográfica del Tajo

Rivers of Spain
Rivers of Castilla–La Mancha
Rivers of the Community of Madrid
Tributaries of the Tagus